The 2007 Tashkent Open was a women's tennis tournament on the 2007 WTA Tour. Pauline Parmentier won the singles title, defeating Victoria Azarenka in the final, while Anastasiya Yakimova and Ekaterina Dzehalevich won the doubles title over Tatiana Poutchek and Anastassia Rodionova.

New players
In the first round, a wildcard named Vlada Ekshibarova entered her first Women's Tennis Association tournament, and raced through her first round match against the sixth seeded Alla Kudryavtseva in straight sets.

Ksenia Palkina from Kyrgyzstan qualified and defeated Ekaterina Dzehalevic in the first round. Palkina then defeated Ekshibarova in three sets to enter her first Women's Tennis Association quarterfinal. Palkina then lost to Victoria Azarenka.

Finals

Singles
 Pauline Parmentier defeated  Victoria Azarenka, 7–5, 6–2

Doubles
 Ekaterina Dzehalevich /  Anastasiya Yakimova defeated  Tatiana Poutchek /  Anastasia Rodionova, 2–6, 6–4, [10–7]

Key
A - Alternate
LL - Lucky loser
Q - Qualifier
r - Retired
w/o - Walkover
WC - Wildcard

Singles seeds

  Victoria Azarenka (final)
  Dominika Cibulková (first round)
  Olga Govortsova (semifinals)
  Elena Vesnina (semifinals)
  Ioana Raluca Olaru (quarterfinals)
  Alla Kudryavtseva (first round)
  Olga Poutchkova (second round)
  Anastasia Rodionova (first round)

Singles draw

Last rounds

Section 1

Section 2

Doubles seeds

  Tatiana Poutchek /  Anastasia Rodionova (finals)
  Mariya Koryttseva /  Darya Kustova (first round)
  Evgeniya Rodina /  Galina Voskoboeva (quarterfinals)
  Marta Domachowska /  Renata Voráčová (semifinals)

Doubles draw

References

External links
 Tournament draws
 ITF tournament edition draws 

 
Tashkent Open
Tashkent
Tashkent Open
Tashkent Open